Canadian official war artists create an artistic rendering of war through the media of visual, digital installations, film, poetry, choreography, music, etc., by showing its impact as men and women are shown waiting, preparing, fighting, suffering, celebrating. These traditionally were a select group of artists who were employed on contract, or commissioned to produce specific works during the First World War, the Second World War and select military actions in the post-war period. The four Canadian official war art programs are: the First World War Canadian War Memorials Fund (CWMF), the Second World War Canadian War Records (CWR), the Cold War Canadian Armed Forces Civilian Artists Program (CAFCAP), and the current Canadian Forces Artists Program (CFAP).

A war artist will have depicted some aspect of war through art; this might be a pictorial record or it might commemorate how war shapes lives. The devastation of war is depicted in painting and drawing quite differently from what a camera can achieve.

The works produced by war artists illustrate and record many aspects of war, and the individual's experience of war, whether allied or enemy, service or civilian, military or political, social or cultural. The role of the artist and his or her work embraces the causes, course and consequences of conflict and it has been primarily an essentially educational purpose, but now is a culturally independent act of witness in contemporary Canada. Official war artists have been appointed by governments for information or propaganda purposes and to record events on the battlefield; but there are many other types of war artist.

First World War

Representative works by Canada's war artists have been gathered into the extensive collection of the Canadian War Museum. In the First World War, Canada developed an official art program under the influence of Lord Beaverbrook. The Canadian-born, England-based businessman viewed war art not only as a form of historical documentation, but also an expression of national identity. He provided leadership in creating the Canadian War Records Office in London in early 1916. Initially, the First World War was documented primarily using photography and film. Some of the extensive footage that official cinematographers produced of soldiers, machinery, and horses was later incorporated into Lest We Forget (1934), directed by Frank Badgley. It was the first feature-length documentary war film made in Canada.

In 1916 Lord Beaverbrook also established the Canadian War Memorials Fund, which was mainly privately funded and evolved into a collection of war art by over one hundred artists and sculptors in Britain and Canada. Under this program, Lord Beaverbrook commissioned one of the first significant Canadian paintings of the First World War, The Second Battle of Ypres, 22 April to 25 May 1915, 1917, by English Canadian artist and illustrator Richard Jack. This commission was intended to address the lack of visual documentation of this major battle.

Some artists who received commissions from the Canadian War Memorials Fund were considered "official" war artists.  For example, the English artist Alfred Munnings was employed as war artist to the Canadian Cavalry Brigade. Munnings painted many scenes, including a mounted portrait of General Jack Seely on his horse Warrior in 1918 (now in the collection of the National Gallery of Canada, Ottawa).  Munnings worked on this canvas a few thousand yards from the German front lines.  When General Seely's unit was forced into a hasty withdrawal, the artist discovered what it was like to come under shellfire.

Munnings also painted Charge of Flowerdew's Squadron in 1918 (now in the collection of the Canadian War Museum, Ottawa).  In what is known as "the last great cavalry charge" at the Battle of Moreuil Wood, Gordon Flowerdew was posthumously awarded the Victoria Cross for leading Lord Strathcona's Horse (Royal Canadians) in a successful engagement with entrenched German forces.

The Canadian Forestry Corps invited Munnings to tour their work camps, and he produced drawings, watercolors and paintings, including Draft Horses, Lumber Mill in the Forest of Dreux in France in 1918. This role of horses was critical and under-reported; and in fact, horse fodder was the single largest commodity shipped to the front by some countries.

The "Canadian War Records Exhibition" at the Royal Academy after war's end included forty-five of Munning's canvasses.

Another example of a war artist embedded with Canadian forces was the Belgian soldier-artist Alfred Bastien whose work is part of the permanent collection of the Canadian War Museum.

In Canada, a separate committee affiliated with the Canadian War Memorials Fund was led by the National Gallery of Canada. It commissioned depictions of the home-front and recommended Canadian artists to serve overseas. Many famous examples of Canadian war art were produced under this program, including A.Y. Jackson's A Copse, Evening, 1918, and Frederick Varley's For What?, 1918.

Second World War

The Canadian War Records (CWR) was the name given to Canada's Second World War art program.  The CWR produced two kinds of art: field sketches and finished paintings. The War Artists' Committee (WAC) recommended that the artists should attempt to share in the experience of "active operations" in order to "know and understand the action, the circumstances, the environment, and the participants." The ultimate goal was defined as "productions" which were "worthy of Canada's highest cultural traditions, doing justice to History, and as works of art, worthy of exhibition anywhere at any time."

There was a general appreciation  of the need to develop what "the camera cannot interpret."  The government recognized that "a war so epic in its scope by land, sea and air, and so detailed and complex in its mechanism, requires interpreting [by artists] as well as recording."

(Edward John) E. J. Hughes enlisted "at the Work Point Barracks in Esquimalt in 1939. Named the first “service artist” in 1941, he spent two winters in Ottawa before being posted to London, where he was attached to different regiments in England and Wales. His paintings of camp life and convoys reflect his keen attention to the details of vehicles, artillery, and uniforms. In 1943, on the Alaskan island of Kiska, he transformed sub-zero weather and howling gales into a powerful document of this remote theatre of war. He returned to Ottawa where he worked until 1946" 

Second Lieutenant Molly Lamb of the Canadian Women's Army Corps was Canada's only woman official war artist in the Second World War. One of her most significant works is Private Roy, 1946, a painted portrait of Sergeant Eva May Roy. She was one of the few Black members of the Canadian Women's Army Corps at the time.

On the 65th anniversary of D-Day, the war artists were recognized and addressed directly in a Ceremony of Remembrance in the Canadian Senate,

Recent conflicts
From 1946 to 2014 over 70+ civilian artists have participated in documenting the Canadian Forces. This was initially supported by the Canadian Armed Forces Civilian Artists Program (CAFCAP) and more recently by the Canadian Forces Artist Program headed by Dr. John MacFarlane. Internationally renowned artists who have participated in the Canadian Forces Artists Program include Gertrude Kearns, Adrian Stimson, Althea Thauberger, Tim Pitsiulak, and Rosalie Favell.

Selected artists

First World War
 Alfred James Munnings, 1878–1959
 John William Beatty, 1869–1941
 Maurice Cullen, 1866–1934
 Kenneth Forbes, 1892–1980
 A. Y. Jackson, 1882–1974
 C.W. Jefferys, 1869–1951
 Wyndham Lewis, 1882–1957
 Arthur Lismer, 1885–1969
 David Milne, 1882–1953
 Charles Walter Simpson, 1878–1942
 Frederick Varley, 1881–1969

Second World War

 E. J. Hughes, 1913-2007 
 Eric Aldwinckle, 1909–1980
Donald Kenneth Anderson,(1920–2009)
 Geoffrey Bagley, 1901–1992
 Aba Bayefsky, 1923–2001
Thomas Harold Beament, 1898–1984
Alan Brockman Beddoe, 1893–1975
Bruno Bobak, 1923–2012
Molly Lamb Bobak, 1922–2014
 Miller Brittain, 1912–1968
Frank Leonard Brooks, 1911–2011
Adolphus George Broomfield, 1906–1992
A. J. Casson, 1898–1992
 Paraskeva Clark, 1898–1986
Albert Edward Cloutier, 1902–1965
Alex Colville, 1920–2013
Charles Fraser Comfort, 1900–1994
Alma Duncan, 1917–2004
 Orville Fisher, 1911–1999
Michael Forster (artist), 1907–2002
 Charles Goldhamer, 1903–1985
Paul Alexander Goranson, 1911–2002 
 Lawren P. Harris, 1910–1994 
Robert Stewart Hyndman, 1915–2009
Charles Anthony Francis Law, 1916–1996.
 Pegi Nicol MacLeod, 1904–1949
Jack Nichols, 1921–2009
William Abernethy Ogilvie, 1901–1989
 Moe Reinblatt (1917–1979)
 Goodridge Roberts, 1904–1974
 Jack Shadbolt OC OBC, 1909–1998
 George Campbell Tinning, 1910–1996

Recent conflicts
Edward Zuber, 1932–
 Suzanne Steele, 2008–2010, the first poet to serve as a war artist (Afghanistan)
 Scott Waters, 2003–4, 2012–14

See also
 Military art
 War photography
 Richard Johnson

Notes

References
 McCloskey, Barbara. (2005). Artists of World War II. Westport: Greenwood Press. ;

Further reading
 Brandon, Laura. War Art in Canada: A Critical History. Toronto: Art Canada Institute, 2021. 
Gallatin, Albert Eugene. Art and the Great War. (New York: E.P. Dutton, 1919).
 Gillis, Raina-Clair. "Artistic Impressions of War," Canadian Military Journal.
 Oliver, Dean Frederick, and Laura Brandon (2000). Canvas of war: painting the Canadian experience, 1914 to 1945. Vancouver: Douglas & McIntyre. 
 Tippett, Maria, 1944. Art at the service of war: Canada, art, and the great war. Toronto; Buffalo: University of Toronto Press.
 E. J. Hughes: Canadian War Artist, 2022, Amos Robert, ISBN 1771513853, Touchwood Editions

External links
 Kandahar Journal War artist Richard Johnson's blog from the front lines in Kandahar, Afghanistan
 A news illustrator War artist Richard Johnson's work from Iraq and Afghanistan
 The Long Road An illustrated article on Canada's ten-year conflict in Afghanistan, by the National Post.
 Painting to Afghanistan Painter Christopher Hennebery embedded with Canadian Forces, Afghanistan
   Official War Artist SMSteele's open diary recording her road to war and back, as a poet, with 1PPCLI to Afghanistan, and her work as a poet, digital artist, writer, and scholar examining the narrative of the Great War 1914–18
  Canadian War Poet Tells Story of Afghanistan in requiem with VSO (Afghanistan: Requiem for a Generation, SMSteele librettist and Jeff Ryan, composer)

Lists of war artists